A Date with Miss Fortune is a 2015 Canadian romantic comedy film, directed by John L'Ecuyer and released in Canada in 2016. The film stars Ryan Scott and Jeannette Sousa as Jack and Maria, a man and woman entering a relationship complicated by the disapproval of Maria's Portuguese family and her fortune teller. Scott and Sousa wrote the film themselves based on their own real-life marriage.

The film also stars Joaquim de Almeida, Vik Sahay and Claudia Ferri, along with supporting character appearances by Nelly Furtado, George Stroumboulopoulos and Shawn Desman.

Daniel Stimac received a Canadian Screen Award nomination for Best Original Song ("Almost Had It All").

References

External links
 

2015 films
2015 romantic comedy films
Canadian romantic comedy films
English-language Canadian films
Films directed by John L'Ecuyer
2010s English-language films
2010s Canadian films